Bribie Island State High School is a high school located on the island of Bribie Island, Queensland, Australia.

Established in 1989, Bribie Island State High School is available for students in grades 7 to 12 and has an enrolment of over 1,000 students.
Anna Paul attended this school.
In 2022, because of the school being awful at keeping attendance roles which and subsequently, an increase of truancy, the school decided to remove the "Passion Project" program it added in 2020 to increase productivity, and to add fun to the school week, it happened every Thursday and its 70 minute time slot has been replaced with a normal subject (mostly math)

References

Public high schools in Queensland
Educational institutions established in 1989
1989 establishments in Australia